King crow or King Crow may refer to:

Jon Snow (character), a fictional character from A Song of Ice and Fire
Black drongo, a bird found in Asia
Euploea klugii, a butterfly found in India and Southeast Asia

See also
Crow